SH2 is a Paralympic shooting classification.

Sport
This Paralympic shooting sport class is designated to shooters with a more severe impairment in the upper limbs, which necessitates them to use a shooting stand. Unlike the SH1 class they shoot with a rifle only and not with pistols.

Becoming classified
Sub-classifications A, B and C define wheelchair backrest height depending on back and pelvic strength per athlete. Ambulant or wheelchair using shooters regardless of sub-classifications A, B or C shoot together in this class.

Classification is handled by International Paralympic Committee Shooting.

IPC Shooting Classification Rules and Regulations
The IPC Shooting Classification Rules and Regulations were published and came into force in May 2012.  The rules reflect the wording of the IPC Classification Code and are a revised version of the previous IPC Classification Rules.

See also 

 SH1 (classification)
 Para-shooting classification

References

External links
IPC Shooting - Classification
IPC Shooting - Official Website

Parasports classifications
Shooting at the Summer Paralympics